Międzylesie is a town in Kłodzko County, Lower Silesian Voivodeship (SW Poland).

Międzylesie (meaning "amid the forest") may also refer to:

Międzylesie, Jelenia Góra County in Lower Silesian Voivodeship (south-west Poland)
Międzylesie, Świętokrzyskie Voivodeship (south-central Poland)
Międzylesie, Gmina Secemin in Świętokrzyskie Voivodeship (south-central Poland)
Międzylesie, Oborniki County in Greater Poland Voivodeship (west-central Poland)
Międzylesie, Turek County in Greater Poland Voivodeship (west-central Poland)
Międzylesie, Wągrowiec County in Greater Poland Voivodeship (west-central Poland)
Międzylesie, Świebodzin County in Lubusz Voivodeship (west Poland)
Międzylesie, Żagań County in Lubusz Voivodeship (west Poland)
Międzylesie, Pomeranian Voivodeship (north Poland)
Międzylesie, Olsztyn County in Warmian-Masurian Voivodeship (north Poland)
Międzylesie, Ostróda County in Warmian-Masurian Voivodeship (north Poland)
Międzylesie, West Pomeranian Voivodeship (north-west Poland)
Międzylesie, borough of Wawer district in Warsaw, Poland since 2002